Endgame is a 2015 American biographical drama film starring Rico Rodriguez, Justina Machado, Efren Ramirez and Ivonne Coll. It is based on the true story of real life teacher Jose Juan "J.J." Guajardo.

Plot

Cast
Rico Rodriguez as Jose
Efren Ramirez as Coach Alvarado
Justina Machado as Karla
Jon Gries as Principal Thomas
Valente Rodriguez as Coach Stevens
Cassie Brennan as Sandy
Xavier Gonzalez as Miguel
Alina Herrera as Dani
Ivonne Coll as Abuela
Ivan Cisneros as Peter
Alesta Orta as Suzie
Glynn Praesel as Jim Tharpe
Jon Steven Flores as Checkmate Jacob Stewart
Daniel Wolfe as Last Year's Champ
Rodrigo Macouzet as Checkmate Paul
Noel Rivera as Checkmate Coach
Cindy Vela as Detention Teacher

Production
The film was shot in Brownsville, Texas.

Release
The film wasn't released in theathers, however, the DVD and Blu-ray sales totaled at $111,100.

Reception
According to the review aggregator website Rotten Tomatoes, 50% of critics have given the film a positive review based on 8 reviews, with an average rating of 6.19/10. Matt Fagerholm of RogerEbert.com awarded the film one and a half stars. Sandie Angulo Chen of Common Sense Media awarded the film three stars out of five. Dann Gire of the Daily Herald awarded the film two stars.

References

External links

American biographical drama films
Films shot in Texas
2015 biographical drama films
2015 drama films
Films about chess
2015 in chess
2010s English-language films
2010s American films